The Bishop of Portsmouth is the Ordinary of the Catholic Diocese of Portsmouth in the Province of Southwark, England.

The bishop's official residence is Bishop's House, Bishop Crispian Way, Portsmouth, Hampshire.

The current bishop is Philip Egan, who was ordained bishop at St John's Cathedral, Portsmouth, on 24 September 2012, the Feast of Our Lady of Walsingham. Bishop Egan was previously the Vicar General for the Diocese of Shrewsbury and his appointment was announced by the Holy See on 11 July 2012. The bishop emeritus is the Right Reverend Crispian Hollis, the 7th bishop of Portsmouth, who was appointed on 6 December 1988. He reached retirement age (75) in November 2011, and retired as Bishop on 11 July 2012 upon his successor's appointment. Bishop Hollis acted as Apostolic Administrator of the Diocese of Portsmouth from 11 July 2012 until Bishop Egan's ordination on 24 September 2012.

History
In 1688 the Portsmouth area came under the authority of the Vicar Apostolic of the London District. On the restoration of the Catholic hierarchy in England and Wales in 1850 Portsmouth became part of the Diocese of Southwark. On 19 May 1882 the Catholic Diocese of Portsmouth was created, and consists of the counties of Hampshire and Dorset, together with Berkshire and Oxfordshire south of the River Thames, plus the Isle of Wight and the Channel Islands.

List of the Catholic bishops of Portsmouth

References